Mount Allyn is a mountain with an elevation of   that is part of the Allyn Range, located within the Chichester State Forest, in the Upper Hunter region of New South Wales, Australia.

Snow often falls in winter. Much of the mountain is covered in Antarctic Beech cool temperate rainforest.

There is dirt-road access to the peak.

See also 

 List of mountains in New South Wales

References 

Dungog Shire
Allyn